Water-miscible oil paint (also called water-soluble oil paint or water-mixable oil paint) is oil paint either engineered or to which an emulsifier has been added, allowing it to be thinned and cleaned up with water. These paints make it possible to avoid using, or at least reduce volatile organic compounds such as turpentine that may be harmful if inhaled.  Water-miscible oil paint can be mixed and applied using the same techniques as traditional oil-based paint, but while still wet it can be removed from brushes, palettes, and rags with ordinary soap and water. One of the ways its water solubility comes from is the use of an oil medium in which one end of the molecule has been engineered to be hydrophilic and thus bind loosely to water molecules, as in a solution. This type of paint is different to those that are engineered to enable cleaning of brushes and application equipment in water but are not in themselves water reducible.

Handling in comparison with other media
The traditional rule of gradation of layers — "fat over lean," or flexible over less flexible — applies to water miscible oil paint as it does to traditional oil, and in this respect the two kinds of paint behave in the same way. However, their handling is slightly different: when thinned with water to a considerably liquid phase, water miscible oil paint tends to feel and behave like watercolor (although, unlike watercolor, and to a greater extent than traditional oil, it may lose adhesion to the ground or support if over-thinned); by contrast, when used as a short paste without water for heavy impasto work, it tends to drag, developing a consistency somewhat "gummier" or tackier than the more buttery one characteristic of oils. At midrange (between short paste and long paste) water miscible oil paint is gouache-like, sharing the properties of both transparent watercolor and opaque oil (in the manner of watercolor, for example, some colors will darken upon drying, the more so as more water is mixed into the paint, and in the manner of oil, the paint film will have some thickness to it). Also gouache-like is the overall effect, which tends to be matte as compared to the glossier oil, but this too is a property that will vary, depending on the pigment used and on any mediums (or diluents) mixed into it, as well as on the pastiness of the paint (as a general rule, the pastier, the glossier). The handling of water miscible oil paint, in summary, changes considerably as it passes from one phase to another. This makes it a versatile medium but, by the same token, it also requires the artist to develop by experience specific skills with which to successfully manipulate it and exploit its range to achieve the desired effect.

Although the practice of mixing water-mixable oils with acrylics is possible (as some brands claim), it is not recommended if the painting's longevity is a concern. The reason is that once the acrylic dries, its impermeability isolates the oil from oxygen, preventing it from oxidizing properly.

Since each manufacture of these paints has its own formula for creating the water-mixable capacity, the following should be checked with each manufacturer’s paint. As the artist writing this paragraph uses Lukas Berlin water-mixable oils, the following applies to Lukas Berlin. They are quite stable on acrylic gesso primed surfaces. Therefore, after all polymerization has occurred, when subjected to a damaging force can with stand quite some force without suffering damage to the paint film. The same is not true when they are applied to oil primed, or oil ground surfaces, i.e., canvas, canvas board, or paper. When fully dried the paint is not fully attached to the oil primed surface. It is easily damaged by any force acted upon it. Subsequent testing has established that Royal Talents’ - Cobra, Holbein Works’ - Duo and Daniel Smith’s - Water Soluble Oil Colors also exhibit the same problem with oil primed surfaces.

In a lighter vain, the other thing you shouldn’t do is to paint in the rain with water mixable oil paints. An artist friend who paints in all kinds of weather with traditional oils was doing just that when he noticed that the paints, he had mixed with white, were running. The tube of white paint a friend had given him was water mixable. However, after completing the oxidation process (completely drying) the surface is as strong as traditional oils and cannot be reactivated with water.

Brands
There are several manufacturers producing water miscible oil paint, including: Daler-Rowney (Georgian Water Mixable Oil);Mont Marte (H2O Water Mixable Oil); Daniel Smith (Water Soluble Oil Colors); Grumbacher (Max Water Mixable Oil); Holbein Works (DUO); Lukas (BERLIN); Martin F. Weber Co. (wOil); Reeves (tube sets and complete painting set); Royal Talens (Cobra Artist and Cobra Study); and Winsor & Newton (Artisan Water Mixable Oil Color).

Mediums
Although this type of paint may be thinned with water, artists may prefer to use specially prepared mediums for improved texture and control.  These mediums improve flow (i.e., make the thinned paint less runny and more easily controlled) and can slow or speed up drying time. Mediums are offered by many of the paint manufacturers.

Royal Talens also has produced a water mixable painting paste that acts as a thickener as well as transparetizer which will not change the consistency of the paint. There are many documented issues with accelerator products in this category causing cracking and damaging the archivability of the medium.

Winsor and Newton has created a special line of oils, mediums, varnishes, and thinners to complement their “Artisan” brand of water mixable oil colors. This line includes thinner, linseed oil, safflower oil, stand oil, painting medium, fast drying medium, and impasto medium, as well as gloss varnish, matt varnish, satin varnish, and varnish remover.

Daniel Smith also offers a range of suitable mediums.

See also
 Waterborne resins

References

Paints